The 1979 Men's South American Volleyball Championship, the 13th tournament, took place in 1979 in Rosario.

Final positions

Mens South American Volleyball Championship, 1979
Men's South American Volleyball Championships
1979 in South American sport
International volleyball competitions hosted by Argentina